James Pearce (born 28 July 1948) is an Australian politician, born in the Sydney suburb of Paddington. He was a member of the Legislative Assembly of Queensland from 1989 to 2009. He returned to the Assembly in 2015 as the member for Mirani, but was defeated in 2017.

Early life 
Before entering politics, Pearce was a coal miner. He was also a Broadsound Shire councillor and served as a Corporal in the Vietnam War.

Political career 
First elected to state parliament at the 1989 state election as the member for Broadsound, Pearce represented the seat of Fitzroy from the 1992 state election onwards following the abolition of Broadsound. A backbencher throughout his 20 years in state politics, he was Secretary of the Parliamentary Labor Party from 1998 to 2001 and Chair of the Select Committee on Travel Safe from 2001 to 2008. During his last term of parliament, Pearce took several months leave to receive treatment for depression. He retired at the 2009 election.

After recovering from his illness, Pearce returned to politics, gaining pre-selection to contest the seat of Mirani at the 2012 election, although he failed to gain the seat.

Pearce was once again endorsed as the Labor Party candidate for the seat of Mirani in 2014, and at the 2015 election he won the seat with a 16.0% swing against the LNP.

After the election he became the Chair of the Infrastructure, Planning and Natural Resources Committee.

At the 2017 election he was defeated by One Nation's Stephen Andrew with a 8.6% swing against him.

Personal life
He has three sons.

References

1948 births
Living people
Members of the Queensland Legislative Assembly
Australian Labor Party members of the Parliament of Queensland
21st-century Australian politicians